Sarhal-e Shirzadi (also Romanized as Sarḩāl-e Shīrāzī) is a village in Vizhenan Rural District, in the Central District of Gilan-e Gharb County, Kermanshah Province, Iran. At the 2006 census, its population was 263, in 55 families.

References 

Populated places in Gilan-e Gharb County